The Dai Gohonzon of the High Sanctuary of the Essential Teachings, commonly known as the Dai Gohonzon (Japanese: 大 御 本 尊  The Supreme (Great) Gohonzon or Honmon—Kaidan—no—Dai—Gohonzon, Japanese: 本 門 戒 壇 の 大 御 本 尊) is a venerated Mandala image inscribed with both Sanskrit and Chinese logographs on a median log trunk of Japanese camphorwood.

The image is worshipped in Nichiren Shoshu Buddhism, which claims to possess within  both the Dharma teachings and Tamashi of Nichiren as inscribed by him on wood, then carved by his artisan disciple Izumi Ajari  Nippo.

The High Priests of Nichiren Shoshu copy and transcribe their own rendition of the image, which is loaned to the followers of the sect. Due to its accorded sacrosanct nature, the mandala can only be audienced to registered Hokkeko believers.

The image was first explicitly mentioned in the last will and testament of Nikko Shonin for his designated successor Nichimoku, annually displayed every April 6 or 7 during the Goreiho O-mushibarai Daiho-e ceremony (English: The Airing of Sacred Treasures; 御霊宝虫払大法会) at the Head Temple.

Buildings at Taiseki-ji Head Temple in Shizuoka, Japan that have housed the Dai Gohonzon are the Shimonobo (1290), the Mutsubo (1332), the Mieido (1680), Gohozo (1717), the Hoanden (1955), the Shohondo (1978), and the Hoando (2002).

Etymology 
The Japanese meanings note:

  Dai —  "Great" or "Supreme"  —  (大)
  Go —  "Sacred" — (御)
  Hon—zon —   "Object of Worship" — (本尊)

Description 
The Dai Gohonzon mandala is a half-log wooden trunk, composed of fragrant Japanese camphorwood believed to be inscribed by Nichiren Daishonin and rendered into wood by Nippo Shonin. The image measures approximately 56.6 inches by 25.6 inches. It is coated in black Urushi lacquer with gilded characters composed of grounded 24-karat gold dust. The bottom portion features the great Zo-han personal signature seal of Nichiren. It features a semi-rounded backing cage and rippled textured surface.

Carved deeply on the image are names of Buddhas, Buddhist and Indian gods along with mystical creatures representing the "Treasure Tower" of the Lotus Sutra which is also claimed to possess and imbue the immortal soul and legacy of Nichiren himself. Furthermore, it also claims to possess the internal enlightenment of Nichiren revealed from a mysterious timeless past, termed as “Nai-Sho.”

The venerated mandala has the following inscriptions on the right lower portion of the image:

 "Honmon-no-Kaidan" (本門戒壇)
 "Ganshu Ya-shiro Kuni-shige" (願主弥四郎国重)
 "Hokke-shura Keihaku"  (法華講衆等敬白)

This Gohonzon is also sometimes venerated as "Ichien-Bodai-Soyo Gohonzon" which refers to its bestowal to the world. Various theories continue to speculate the true identity of "Yashiro Kunishige." The High Priest Nittatsu Shonin once remarked the vague possibility that "Ya-shiro" refers to "Jin-shiro", the older brother of Yaroguro, one the three martyred disciples in 1279.

The Dai Gohonzon image is transcribed by the living incumbent who serves as High Priest of the sect (Hossu). As High Priest, this permits the rendition of the mandala to range from being fully transcribed or abbreviated or to add and subtract whatever is deemed appropriate into the Gohonzon. There are two recognized forms of a transcription of the Dai-Gohonzon:

 Moji Mandala —  (Transcribed on paper) 
 Ita Gohonzon — (Transcription on wooden board)

The application for transcribing the Dai Gohonzon image is found in five forms:

 Joju Gohonzon — oftentimes granted to designated temples, propagation buildings and personalities who have directly served and protected the Dai Gohonzon over the centuries. 
 Okatagi Gohonzon — a woodblocking printed rendition that is loaned to general membership of the sect, usually framed in an ornamental scroll. 
 Tokubetsu "Special" Okatagi Gohonzon — A larger size on a silk frame that is sometimes granted to highly commendable members on the sole discretion of a temple Chief Priest. 
 Doshi Gohonzon — a special funeral paper Gohonzon that is portably used in religious ceremonies where a memorial remembrance is held. It oftentimes bears two extraordinary deities, the King Yenma and the "Godomyokan" (The infernal officials who assist King Yenma from the Five Lower Worlds). The 26th High Priest Nichikan Shonin transcribed Gohonzons in this manner, which has also since been customary for future High Priests to emulate. 
 Omamori Gohonzon — a miniature paper Gohonzon in abbreviated format designated for traveling practitioners. This Gohonzon is typically sealed in a protective display case.

Every year on April 6 or 7 at the O-Mushibarai ceremony, the High Priest of Nichiren Shoshu takes on the formal task of cleaning the accumulated dust on the surface of the Dai Gohonzon. The recitation of Ushitora Gongyo is not directed to the mandala, rather the Buddhist ritual of Gokaihi (御開扉; "Opening the Butsudan doors") is directly offered instead.

Mythos 

Legend claims that a Tennyo goddess named Shichimen  (disguised as a little girl) kept following Nichiren Daishonin who at the time was reciting the Lotus Sutra at the Koza stone in Myosekibo temple (妙 石 坊). Nichiren confronted her, and the mystical figure introduced herself as a water deity seeking to be absolved from past Negative Karma. Nichiren then took a reflective vase (mirror) and placed it before her, revealing her true identity as a red water dragon, gaining Buddhahood at that moment.  Nichiren then instructed her to return to the lake "Ichi—no—ike" and remain there to protect the Kuon Ji Temple. This same deity is claimed to have sent the log of what would become the Dai Gohonzon when Nippo Shonin wanted to carve a statue of his master, Nichiren.

According to the doctrines of Nichiren Shoshu based on the Gosho writing Jogyo-Shu-den-Sho, Nippo underwent immense fasting and prayer to the dragon goddess Shichimen, the patroness of Yamanashi prefecture. The goddess, owing her enlightenment to Nichiren, answered his prayer by sending a log in a nearby river. The Dai Gohonzon image was transferred into a procured wood log from the water goddess by Nippo Shonin, one of his junior disciples. Recounted in the legend:

Once stored in the Kuon-ji temple in Yamanashi Prefecture, the image was later confiscated by Nikko Shonin, who designated his strongest disciple, Hyakken-bo to carry the image on his backside through the forest into the Taisekiji complex, where it remains today. Additionally, the statue of Nichiren carved by Nippo from the leftover remains of the original Camphorwood log is stored in a stupa next to the Dai-Gohonzon in the Hoando at Taisekiji.

Accordingly, this mythological account is disputed as one of the many apocryphal forgeries  invented by Nichiren Shoshu according to other opposing Nichiren sects.

Account tales of persecution 

The Fuji School Branch refers to the Nichiren Buddhist denominations stemming from Nichiren's disciple Nikko Shonin. These schools believe that Nichiren inscribed the Dai Gohonzon.

The Fuji Branch believes that in the autumn of 1279, a number of Nichiren's laypeople in the Fuji District were targeted by Gyōchi (行 智), the chief priest of a temple where Nisshū (日 秀), one of Nichiren's disciples lived. The  peasant farmers from the village of Atsuhara had come to help Nisshū with the harvest of his private rice crop. The priest Gyōchi called some local warriors to arrest the peasants, accusing them of illegally harvesting the rice. The peasants decided to defend themselves when the warriors arrived but were no match, and several were wounded; twenty were arrested and hauled off to Kamakura for trial. When they arrived, a local police officer named Hei no Saemon Yoritsuna attempted to intimidate the peasants into renouncing their faith — on pain of death if they did not, but in exchange for their freedom if they did. Despite repeated threats and even torture, they remained steadfast. Hei no Saemon had three beheaded, but the other 17 refused to back down and he eventually freed them. The Fuji Branch believes that these events took place on 15 October 1279.

The Nichiren Shoshu sect claims the following regarding the Dai Gohonzon's nature and purpose:

 That Nichiren Daishonin decided to inscribe the Dai Gohonzon as a result of these persecuting events. Furthermore, it taught as a doctrine that this served his purpose in entering the sahā world, (出世の本懐,  Shusse—no—Honkai). On 12 October 1279, he inscribed the Gohonzon known as the "Dai Gohonzon," which – in contrast to other Gohonzon inscribed in this period – is intended for worship by all his disciples and believers, contemporary and future, rather than just the specific individual named on it. Furthermore, only the Sovereign of Japan can enshrine the image in its permanent Temple when widespread propagation of the religion is accomplished.
 The sect teaches that due to the Kamakura Shogunate refusing to heed Nichiren's prophecies on natural disasters and incoming foreign invasion, the Buddhist deities have began to abandon Japan in its natural environment, claiming the result of arson at the Tsurugaoka Hachimangū Shrine in 14 November 1280, approximately one year after the inscription of the Dai Gohonzon image.
 The sect further teaches that the returning  Karma punishment from the Dai Gohonzon was imposed on the police officer " Hei no Saemon-no-jō Yoritsuna" on 29 May 1293, fourteen years after murdering three of the first Hokkeko believers during the "Atsuhara Persecutions" in Suruga province. These mystical punishments  included their political defeat and joint—suicide of his  younger son Tametsuna Iinuma (Sukemune) and eldest son Munetsuna Nagasaki who was expelled and died in Sado island (via suicide into the sea according to pious legends).

Claims of origin
The Nichiren Shōshū sect claims that Nichiren inscribed the Dai Gohonzon on 12 October 1279 (Japanese: Ko-an). Nichiren Shōshū adherents cite the following passage in Nichiren's "On Persecutions Befalling the Sage" addressed to the Buddhist Samurai warrior Shijo Nakatsukasa Saburō Saemon—no—jō Yorimoto (四条中務三郎左衛門尉頼基, 1230–1296), which they assert supports the origin story of the image: "...Shakyamuni Buddha fulfilled the purpose of his advent in a little over 40 years, — the Great Teacher Zhiyi took about 30 years — and the Great Teacher Saichō, some 20 years. I have spoken repeatedly of the indescribable persecutions they suffered during those years. 
For myself, Nichiren, it took 27 years, and the great persecutions I faced during this period are well known to you all."

According to the sect, the creation of the Dai Gohonzon image is the ultimate purpose of Nichiren's entrance into the Sahā world of humans. Furthermore, they claim that this particular Gohonzon was inscribed so that all people in the Third Age of Buddhism can attain Buddhahood in their present life existence (Sokushin Jobutsu). Nikko Shonin's last will and testament document to Nichimoku Shonin, "Articles to be Observed After the Passing of Nikko" ("Nikko ato jojo no koto"), states "...The Dai-Gohonzon of the second year of Kō`an (1279), which Nikko inherited, is hereby bequeathed to Nichimoku." Two original transfer documents exist written by Nikko Shonin.  Of the two, the first document is a draft written in the second year of Gentoku (1330).  The second is the actual transfer document itself, dated the first year of Shoukei (1332). Both documents are signed by Nikko Shonin.  The signatures on these documents have been determined to be consistent with Nikko Shonin's signature from the period in his life.

Additionally, the third High Priest, Nichimoku Shonin, stated "...The Dai-Gohonzon, which was entrusted upon the person of Nikko, is the plank Gohonzon. It is now here at this temple (Taisekiji)." From documents written by Nikko Shonin and Nichimoku Shonin, the Dai-Gohonzon was transferred between the successive high priests of Nichiren Shoshu. The sect further claims that the Dai Gohonzon may only be publicly enshrined for widespread access when Japan converts to this religion, including the Emperor of Japan who is charged the formal task to decree that a national shrine for the image can be built at the foot of Mount Fuji.

The fourteenth High Priest, Nisshu Shonin, stated in his writing "On Articles to Be Observed after the Passing of Nikko" ("Nikko ato jojo no koto jisho"), "...The Gohonzon concerns the transfer matters of Taiseki-ji, which denotes the exclusive transfer from one high priest to another. The Dai Gohonzon of the High Sanctuary of the Essential Teaching, which Nikko Shonin inherited from the Daishonin and transferred to Nichimoku Shonin in the era of Shoan, is exactly and changelessly the whole entity of the transfer through the Nichiren–Nikko–Nichimoku lineage in the Latter Day of the Law."

The Nichiren Shoshu sect teaches that the image is inherited from one singular High Priest to the next living incumbent. Accordingly, the sect teaches that there are two kinds of transmission of its Dharma essence: "specific transmission," referred to by the sect as the "Heritage of the Entity of the Law," which claims the Dai Gohonzon image is bestowed and entrusted to each of the successive High Priests passed on by one person at a given time; and "general transmission," referred to by the sect as "Heritage of Faith" and pertaining to both disciples and believers who chant and follow closely its doctrines. Accordingly, the priesthood of the sect claims that due to the present incompleteness of the altar of the Dai Gohonzon, it is not enshrined with Japanese Shikimi evergreen plants nor Taiko drums. In addition, they believe that the Dai Gohonzon should not be exposed for public view until kosen-rufu is achieved, primarily referring to Nichiren Shoshu becoming the main religion on the planet.

The 26th High Priest, Nichikan Shonin, declared in his treatise "Exegesis on the True Object of Worship" ("Kanjin no honzon-sho mondan") the following regarding the image: "...The Gohonzon of the High Sanctuary of the Essential Teaching, inscribed in the second year of Koan (1279), is the ultimate, the absolute, and the final cause of the Daishonin's advent. It is the greatest among the Three Great Secret Laws and the supreme object of worship in the entire world." Due to this charge of protecting the image, 59th High Priest Nichiko Hori declared the following regarding the matter: "In the early times, this matter (the Dai-Gohonzon) was not publicized within our school nor outside." On 16 September 1972, the 66th High Priest Nittatsu Hosoi Shonin in Hokeiji Temple in Omuta, Fukuoka Prefecture  asserted the authenticity of the wooden image, and cited the procurement of the log from a secluded part of Mount Minobu in response to the claims of external sourcing of the wood by other sects.

Claims of forgery

Fraudulent pious invention
Some  sects of Nichiren Shu and modernist factions of the Soka Gakkai reject the image as fraudulent, citing independent analysis of the calligraphy style, and asserting that Nichiren never mentions this particular Buddhist mandala in any of his authenticated preserved writings. Such varying Nichiren sects claim that these types of invented wooden mandalas were rampant among Hokkeko believers during the latter Muromachi period.

Furthermore, such sects maintain that Nichiren never meant to permanently enshrine Buddhist Mandalas in a written format, but intended to permit both written form and Buddhist statues in the Gohonzon arrangement after his own demise. Owing to the scarcity of financial sources during Nichiren's own lifetime, they dismiss the claim of a Dai-Gohonzon's purpose and exclusive privilege to the present time.

Multiple Dai Gohonzons
Researchers of the Nichiren Mandala Study Workshop claim that the Head Temple Taisekiji have had at least four different Dai Gohonzons, alleging that the current version of the Dai Gohonzon is just one of several modern reproductions made over time after fires at Taiseki-ji destroyed previous copies. The most notable and significant size changes after fire outbreaks have been recorded in the years 1600,  1764,  1911 and the current Dai Gohonzon, which was allegedly  created  by the 67th High Priest  Nikken Shonin. However, no objective proof exists to substantiate these claims.

The researchers further state that the image, having been analyzed by independent calligraphers, is a combination image based on a latter Gohonzon from Taiyu Ajari Nichizon (太夫阿闍梨日尊, 1265 — 1345), a disciple of Nikko Shonin in the 14th  century. This claim is dated to 8 May 1280 and was allegedly bought and sold through the Kitayama Honmonji temple by the 56th High Priest Nichi-O shonin, who founded the Grand Hodo-in Temple in Tokyo and later used it as the official Gohonzon for Taisekiji. This Nichizon Gohonzon is presently stored in Taisekiji and is displayed for the public to see during the April ceremonies. Due the Dai-Gohonzon not being open to the public, evidence of this claim has not been proven.

Falsified dating strata and amalgamation
In addition, some researchers state that the Dai Gohonzon image is fake and not consistent with any other Gohonzon that Nichiren inscribed in 1279. Instead, they claim the scholarly calligraphy style of the Dai Gohonzon is more accurately dated to 8 May 1280, instead of 12 October 1279. Accordingly, a 19th-century calligraphy scholar and priest Kaiso Inada  (稲田海素, 1 November  1869 — 26 February 1956), was a colleague of the Nichiren Shoshu 59th High Priest Nichiko Shonin. The priest Inada had recorded that he was granted lodging at Taiseki-ji and was able to examine the Dai Gohonzon image and other Nichiren mandalas stored within the Head Temple. He  concluded that the Dai Gohonzon stored at Taiseki-ji was created using different sheets traced from at least two other Nichiren mandalas. His Colleague Hori Nichiko Shonin strongly disagreed with his conclusion, and dealt very critically with claims against the authenticity of the Dai-Gohonzon.

The leaked journals of Reverend Jitoku Kawabe
During the 1990s, a controversial intrigue involving the 67th High Priest Nikken Abe Shonin was exposed in the Japanese media by the Soka Gakkai, claiming that the retrieved extant notes of a senior priest, Reverend Jitoku Kawabe (19 November 1929 — 10 November 2002, former Chief Priest of Keidai-ji Temple in Tokushima Prefecture) wrote in his 7 February 1978 private journals at the Imperial Hotel, Tokyo that the High Priest Nikken Shonin was fully aware that the Dai-Gohonzon was not authentic. As a result, Kawabe publicly apologized for his leaked notes, recanting them to exonerate any involvement with the 67th High Priest, citing his own poor memory and careless discretion.

Parallel legends 

A celebrated Samurai warrior named Taira—no—Morihisa allegedly experienced the same miraculous events similar to the execution of Nichiren at Shichirigahama beach prior to inscribing the Dai Gohonzon mandala eighty-six years earlier. In year 1193 (Kenkyu Year), Morihisa was a surviving warrior that was defeated by the Genji clan after the Genpei War. On the way to Kamakura, he claimed to have received a dream from the Buddhist deities instructing him to recite the Lotus Sutra for salvation. He held on to reading a copy of the Chapter 25 of the Lotus Sutra dedicated to the goddess Kanzeon. As the executioner prepared to behead him, a great light allegedly appeared from the Sutra scroll which blinded his eyesight and destroyed the executioners sword.

Morihisa presented this miraculous account of testimony to Lord Minamoto no Yoritomo, the first Kamakura Shogun of Japan, who claimed he experienced a similar vision and granted him clemency and freedom. Nichiren Shoshu teaches that this account is the same proof that the Dai Gohonzon offers in the nearing advent of Nichiren, who they interpret as the "True Buddha of Compassion" (but disguised as Kanzeon bodhisattva).

Dai-Gohonzon replicas 

In addition to the Nichiren Shoshu sect, other mandalas given the appellation of "Dai Gohonzon" are in the possession of the Kitayama Honmonji sect, the Fujisan Honmon Shoshu sect and one by Soka Gakkai.

The general sentiment among these sects is that neither Nichiren nor his disciple Nikko Shonin ever specified a particular special mandala as the singular object of worship nor to be granted the national title of "Honmonji", a claim that the Taisekiji temple claims as their sole inherited right via the successorship of Nikko Shonin and possession of their Dai Gohonzon mandala.

 The Kitayama Honmonji temple of Nichiren Shu sect — Located in Omosu, Suruga Province of Japan, claims another Dai Gohonzon inscribed by Nichiren. This temple claims to be the grave site of Nikkō Shōnin, whom they regard as their own temple founder.
 The Fujisan Honmon Shoshu sect — In Kamakura city in Kanagawa Prefecture there also claims possession of a Dai Gohonzon inscribed by Nichiren, which they refer to as the Dai-Honzon, enshrined at Hota Myohonji Temple. This mandala carries the inscription of The Great Object of Worship to Save and Protect for Ten Thousand Years and carries a signature of Jogyo Nichiren.
 The Soka Gakkai International — a modern lay Buddhist organization formerly affiliated with the Taisekiji Head Temple possesses a  1974 wooden copy as transcribed by the 64th Nichiren Shoshu High Priest Nissho Shonin, then carved by Japanese artisan Takeshi Akazawa. Originally enshrined at the Soka building in Osaka, that Gohonzon is now enshrined within "The Hall of the Great Vow for Kosen-rufu" (広 宣 流 布 大 誓 堂, Kosen—Rufu Dai—Sei—Do) in Shinanomachi, Shinjuku, Tokyo. The decision came after its longstanding claim to religious independence after splitting with the Nichiren Shoshu sect in 1991, followed by the revision of the Soka Gakkai constitution on 8 November 2014, by which Soka Gakkai President Minoru Harada declared that the original mandala in Taisekiji temple is not their "Object of Worship". The entry for the Dai Gohonzon image was removed from the "SGI Dictionary of Buddhism" in 2010. Some progressive modernist factions within Soka Gakkai maintain that the original image at Taisekiji Head Temple is fake and was manufactured by the Nichiren Shoshu priesthood.

Former places of storage and enshrinement 
The Dai Gohonzon image was brought by Nikko Shonin to the Mutsubo, and was stored at the Shimonobo temple in Fujinomiya, the historical "Jibutsudo" residence of Nanjo Tokimitsu, the land donor of the present Taisekiji Temple. Later it was enshrined in the Great Kaidan hall as well as the Gohozo treasury building of Taisekiji. In October 1972, the image was enshrined in the Shohondo building funded by Nichiren Shoshu members, Soka Gakkai members, Kempon Hokke Shu believers, and family relatives of Nichiren Shoshu temple priests. The building was demolished in 1998.

The image was removed from the Sho-Hondo building in April 1998 and was temporarily stored in the Go-Hozo treasure house. The image is presently housed in the Shumidan (English: Mount Sumeru) high altar within the Hoando building of Taisekiji, which contains 5,004 reserved seats for Nichiren Shoshu lay followers, 236 Tatami mats for priests, and a center chair for the High Priest of Nichiren Shoshu.

Gallery of transcriptions

See also 
 Honzon

Notes

Sources 
 Nichiren Mandala Study Workshop
The Writings of Nichiren Daishonin, Soka Gakkai, 1999 (available online here.)
The Life of Nichiren Daishonin. Kirimura, Yasuji. Nichiren Shoshu International Centre, 1980Note: NSIC, publisher of this work, is no longer associated with Nichiren Shoshu and is now affiliated with Soka Gakkai.

Buddhist ritual implements
Mandalas
Nichiren Buddhism